Waldrausch is a 1962 Austrian drama film directed by Paul May and starring Marianne Hold, Gerhard Riedmann and Ingeborg Schöner. It is based on the novel Waldrausch by Ludwig Ganghofer. Another film adaptation was made in 1977. An architect proposes a plan to build a dam, flooding a valley.

Cast
 Marianne Hold  ...  Beda
  Gerhard Riedmann ...  Ambros Lutz
  Ingeborg Schöner ...  Annette von Larenburg
  Sieghardt Rupp ...  Crispin Sagenbacher
  Paul Hartmann ...  Der alte Stuiber
  Peter Toifl ...  Der kleine Toni
  Adrienne Gessner ...  Die Zieblingen
  Alexander Trojan ...  Boris von Larenburg
  Sepp Rist ...  Der Mann von Kaprun
  Edd Stavjanik ...  Diener Kesselschmidt
  Hans Habietinek ...  Regierungsrat
  Raoul Retzer ...  Der Lange
  Walter Regelsberger ...  Ein Fahrer
  Herbert Fux ...  Bauführer Seidl
  Walter Lehr ...  Peter Stich

References

External links

1962 films
1962 drama films
1960s German-language films
Films based on works by Ludwig Ganghofer
Films based on German novels
Films directed by Paul May
Remakes of German films
Films set in the Alps
Films set in forests
Austrian drama films